The Evolution of Katherine is a 1914 play by the British writer E. Temple Thurston. In 1916 it was adapted into a film Driven directed by Maurice Elvey. It is one of a number of Thurston's works to be turned into films. The play is sometimes itself alternatively known as Driven.

References

Bibliography
 Goble, Alan. The Complete Index to Literary Sources in Film. Walter de Gruyter, 1999.

1914 plays
British plays adapted into films